Edward Bowes (June 14, 1874 – June 13, 1946), professionally known as Major Edward Bowes, was an American radio personality of the 1930s and 1940s whose Major Bowes Amateur Hour was the best-known amateur talent show on radio during its 18-year run (1935–1952) on NBC Radio and CBS Radio.

Early life and radio career
Bowes’ father died when he was six years old, and young Edward worked as he could to augment the family income.  After leaving grammar school he worked as an office boy, and then went into the real estate business, until the cataclysmic 1906 San Francisco earthquake wiped out his fortune. He then moved to New York City in search of other opportunities, soon realizing that the theatrical world was lucrative, and he worked busily in New York as a musical conductor, composer, and arranger. He also produced Broadway shows such as Kindling in 1911–12 and The Bridal Path in 1913. He was married to  Kindling star Margaret Illington from 1910 until her death in 1934; her portrait by Adolfo Müller-Ury had been painted in 1906 for her first husband, theater manager Daniel Frohman.

He became managing director of New York's Capitol Theatre, which he ran with military efficiency. He insisted on being addressed as "Major Bowes," a nickname that sprang from his earlier military rank, though historians are divided on whether he was an active-duty officer in World War I or held the rank as a member of the Officer Reserve Corps. 

Bowes brought his best-known creation to New York radio station WHN in 1934. He had actually hosted scattered amateur nights on smaller stations while manager of the Capitol. Within a year of its WHN premiere, The Original Amateur Hour—its original name, according to historian Gerald Nachman, was Major Bowes and His Capitol Family—began earning its creator and host as much as $1 million a year, according to Variety. 

The rapid popularity of The Original Amateur Hour made him better known than most of the talent he featured. Some of his discoveries became stars, including opera stars Lily Pons, Robert Merrill, and Beverly Sills; comedian Jack Carter; pop singer Teresa Brewer; and Frank Sinatra, fronting a quartet known as the Hoboken Four when they appeared on the show in 1935.

The show consistently ranked among radio's top ten programs throughout its run. Bowes' familiar catchphrase "Round and round she goes, and where she stops nobody knows," was spoken in the familiar avuncular tones for which he was renowned, whenever it was time to spin the "wheel of fortune," the device by which some contestants were called to perform. In the early days of the show, whenever a performer was simply too terrible to continue, Bowes would stop the act by striking a gong (a device that would be revived in the 1970s by Chuck Barris's infamous The Gong Show). Bowes heard from thousands of listeners who objected to his terminating these acts prematurely, so he abandoned the gong in 1936. Nachman recorded that Bowes, "a businesslike fellow with a mirthless chuckle who, unlike most emcees, had a gift for nongab," went out of his way to make contestants feel at ease, often taking them to dinner before their appearances. Nachman credits Bowes for featuring more black entertainers than many network shows of the time.

Death and legacy

Major Bowes died on the eve of his 72nd birthday at his home in the New Jersey suburb of Rumson, New Jersey. The following week, his talent coordinator Ted Mack took over hosting duties.  Nineteen months after Bowes' death, on January 18, 1948, the program, with Ted Mack as host, debuted on the DuMont Television Network.  As a measure of the affection attached to Bowes' name, the show continued to be called Major Bowes' Original Amateur Hour until the 1950-51 season, when it became simply Original Amateur Hour, and in 1955 became Ted Mack and the Original Amateur Hour.  Mack continued to host the show throughout the remainder of its run, during which it ran on all four major networks, until 1970.  The radio version, also with Mack, ran until 1952.

Bowes was referred to in Cab Calloway's "I Love to Singa" from the movie The Singing Kid (1936), and in the Dorothy Fields lyrics for "Never Gonna Dance," from the Astaire-Rogers film Swing Time (1936).  He is also referenced in the song I'm Still Here from Sondheim's 1971 musical Follies. 

Major Bowes is referenced in The Twilight Zone episode, "Static" (1961), as his show is heard on a mysterious radio that tunes into channels that no longer exist; his famous catch phrase "round and round she goes, where she stops nobody knows," is mentioned.

Bowes was a benefactor of the Catholic Church. Our Lady of Victory Church in Lower Manhattan is built on land donated by Bowes. Also, the auditorium at Archbishop Stepinac High School in White Plains is named in his honor. He donated some of the rare books at St. Joseph's Seminary, Yonkers.

In 1939, Major Bowes donated his multi-acre Ossining estate, known as "Laurel Hill," to the Lutheran Church, where it is still being enjoyed as an ecumenical retreat center.  Run by a board of Lutheran lay persons and clergy, it is known as Major Edward Bowes Memorial Retreat, and operates year-round for students, church, and community groups in the greater New York metro area.

References

Further reading
 Gerald Nachman, Raised on Radio (New York: Pantheon Books, 1998)

External links

Encyclopædia Britannica article on Edward Bowes
Old Time Radio Researchers Database of People and Programs

1874 births
1946 deaths
American theatre managers and producers
Radio personalities from San Francisco
Burials at Sleepy Hollow Cemetery
Businesspeople from San Francisco
People from Rumson, New Jersey